Gladys Aller (July 13, 1915 - March 5, 1970) was an American painter.

1915-1940
Gladys Aller was born in Massachusetts. Until applying for a passport in her forties, she thought she was born on July 14. Her father, Simeon Aller, being superstitious about Friday the 13th, had always told her she was born the day after. Her father, a Jewish Russian emigre, moved with his brother Joseph Aller to Hollywood in 1920 to work in the film industry. Her uncle Joseph Aller ran the darkroom for D. W. Griffith while her father sold raw film to the studios for Dupont. Other relatives were her uncle Modest Altschuler, the conductor and founder of the Russian Symphony Orchestra, and her uncle Gregory (Grisha) Aller, his daughter Eleanor Aller, both cellists, his son, pianist Victor Aller, and her cousin, art director Boris Leven. She was the youngest member admitted to the California Watercolor Society  at the age of 14. At 15 she left high school to attend the Otis Art Institute (now called the Otis College of Art and Design).  She also studied in Los Angeles at Chouinard Art Institute. In 1933 she went to New York City to study at The Art Students League of New York with George Grosz, Richard Lahey, and John Sloan.

Her watercolor "Portrait of Helen" was purchased by the New York Metropolitan Museum in 1937. In the Metropolitan Museum of Art Bulletin 35.11 in 1940,  Harry B. Wehle wrote, "The West Coast has in recent years produced a particularly promising crop of water colorists, including Millard Sheets, Dong Kingman, George Post, Alexander Nepote, Milford Zornes and Gladys Aller."

Other exhibits include the California Water Color Society, 1930-46 (prizes); Painters & Sculptors of LA, 1937–38; Los Angeles County Museum of Art (LACMA), 1941–43; Pennsylvania Academy of Fine Arts PAFA, 1937–40; Zeitlin Gallery (LA), 1938 (solo); All-Calif. Exhibition, 1939; Museum of Fine Arts, Boston, Brooklyn Museum, the Legion of Honor at San Francisco, San Diego Gallery of Fine Arts, and Riverside Museum in New York City.

As an example of the art scene in Los Angeles in the 1930s, in February 1937, the Los Angeles unit of the American Artists' Congress held a Surrealist Valentine's Ball in Hollywood. Los Angeles artists gathered in elaborate costumes. Fletcher Martin, Edward Biberman, Eula Long, Brooke Waring, Tom Craig, Yvonne Siegel, Elaine Fullerson, and Charles Teske participated. Costumes were judged by Jean Muir, George Antheil, Paul T. Franco and Stella Adler while Eddie Barefield's swing band played.

1940-1970

On July 14, 1941, she married orthodontist Eugene Farber and moved with him to Los Angeles. After the Japanese attacked Pearl Harbor in December of that same year, her husband joined the US Air Force as a dentist. She accompanied him to his postings at Hamilton Air Force Base in Northern California, and at Tonopah Army Air Field (now known as Tonopah Air Force Base in Nevada. There she taught painting to the officers' wives and was fascinated by the landscape there, painting her "File:Two Women of Tonopah."She also painted her "Tonopah Laundry" oil focusing on the migrant women laborers.

After the war, they returned to Los Angeles, where her husband started a practice in Beverly Hills, and they raised two children. A number of her cubist style portraits of women were painted after the war. See "Lady With Hat."

In the 1960s Gladys Aller, now known as Gladys Farber, became politically active, starting with "SOS - Stamp Out Smog" which led to the Clean Air Act. She was one of the original members of Women Strike for Peace working for nuclear disarmament and the Test Ban Treaty. She helped organize, and traveled on, a trip to the Soviet Union in the midst of the Cold War which they called "Women's Peace Plane to Moscow" in 1963. She subsequently became active in the anti-Vietnam War movement.

Artistically, in the 1950s and 1960s, her work moved away from figurative watercolors and oils and towards abstract expressionism from the earlier influences of the Ashcan School, the Southern California watercolor school, Diego Rivera and the Mexican Mural Movement, and German Expressionism. She worked in the studio of LA artist Sueo Serisawa. A close group of women painters gathered in that studio in the 1960s, often combining art with politics. Mary Clarke, Lucy Adelman (who was later one of the founders of the Womanspace Gallery and subsequently the ArtSpace Gallery), and Wallace Albertson were some of the other painters in the group.

Sources

Dimand, Maurice S., and Avery C. Louise. "Notes." The Metropolitan Museum of Art Bulletin 35.8 (1940): 165-67. Web.
Edan Hughes, "Artists in California, 1786-1940"
Southern California Artists (Nancy Moure);
California Arts and Architecture list, 1932; Who's Who in American Art 1938-62.

References

1915 births
1970 deaths
Artists from Massachusetts
Chouinard Art Institute alumni
Painters from California
American watercolorists
20th-century American painters
American women painters
20th-century American women artists